Schwartz's worm snake (Typhlops schwartzi) is a species of snake in the family Typhlopidae. The species is endemic to the Dominican Republic.

Etymology
The specific name, schwartzi, is in honor of American herpetologist Albert Schwartz.

References

Further reading
Thomas R. 1989. "The relationships of Antillean Typhlops (Serpentes: Typhlopidae) and the description of three new Hispaniolan species. pp. 409–432. In: Woods CA (editor). 1989. Biogeography of the West Indies: Past, Present, and Future. Gainesville, Florida: Sandhill Crane Press. xvii + 878 pp. (Typhlops schwartzi, new species, p. 409).

Typhlops
Endemic fauna of the Dominican Republic
Reptiles of the Dominican Republic
Reptiles described in 1989